Clann na nGael Aughabrack Dunamanagh G.A.C., is a Gaelic Athletic Association club based in north County Tyrone, Northern Ireland, with its home grounds based at Aughabrack and Dunamanagh.

History
The Club was formed in 1996 from an amalgamation of Dunamanagh and Aughabrack as Donagheady Gaels; renamed Clann na nGael Aughabrack Dunamanagh G.A.C. in 1997.

Aughabrack was established in 1979 as junior club. Previous club existed in the area in 1948-52. Promoted to Division 2 at end of first season of competition, and to Division 1 at end of second season; amalgamated at Youth level with Dunamanagh, St Patrick's as Donagheady; 1995. Won Frank O Neill Cup. Club won two Tyrone titles at Adult Scór.

Notable players

Brian Dooher
Stephen O’neill
Shay Dooher

Roll of honour
 Tyrone Junior Football Championship (1)
 1997
 Tyrone Junior Football League (1) 
 1997
 Tyrone Intermediate Football Championship (1)
 1998
 Tyrone Intermediate Football League (1)
 1998
 Tyrone Senior Football League (1)
 2002

External links
 Clann na nGael GAA

Gaelic games clubs in County Tyrone
Gaelic football clubs in County Tyrone